The women's pentathlon event at the 1965 Summer Universiade was held at the People's Stadium in Budapest on 28 August 1965. It was the first time that combined events were held for women at the Universiade.

Results

References

Athletics at the 1965 Summer Universiade
1965